The 2017 California Vulcans football team represented California University of Pennsylvania in the 2017 NCAA Division II football season. It was the second season for the team with head coach Gary Dunn.

Schedule

Rankings

References

California
California Vulcans football seasons
California Vulcans football